Greigia is a genus of plants in the family Bromeliaceae, subfamily Bromelioideae. It is native to Latin America from Mexico to Chile. The genus is named in honour of Major General Samuel Alexjewitsch Greig, president of the Russian Horticultural Society in 1865.

Greigias are unique among bromeliads in that they do not die after flowering. Instead, they continue to bloom every year from the same rosette.

Species
 Greigia acebeyi B.Will, T.Krömer, M.Kessler, Karger & H.Luther - Bolivia
 Greigia alborosea (Grisebach) Mez - Venezuela
 Greigia aristeguietae L.B. Smith - Venezuela
 Greigia atrobrunnea H. Luther - Ecuador 
 Greigia atrocastanea H. Luther - Bolivia
 Greigia berteroi Skottsberg - Juan Fernández Islands
 Greigia cochabambae H. Luther - Bolivia
 Greigia collina L.B. Smith - Cundinamarca
 Greigia columbiana L.B. Smith - Costa Rica, Panama, Colombia, Ecuador, Venezuela
 Greigia danielii L.B. Smith - Colombia, Bolivia
 Greigia exserta L.B. Smith - Colombia
 Greigia kessleri H. Luther - Bolivia
 Greigia landbeckii (Lechler ex Philippi) Philippi - Chile
 Greigia leymebambana H. Luther - Peru
 Greigia macbrideana L.B. Smith - Peru
 Greigia marioi B.Will, T.Krömer, M.Kessler, Karger & H.Luther - Bolivia
 Greigia membranacea B.Will, T.Krömer, M.Kessler, Karger & H.Luther - Bolivia
 Greigia mulfordii L.B. Smith - Colombia, Ecuador
 Greigia nubigena L.B. Smith - Colombia 
 Greigia oaxacana L.B. Smith - Oaxaca, Chiapas
 Greigia ocellata L.B. Smith & Steyermark - Venezuela 
 Greigia pearcei Mez - Chile
 Greigia racinae L.B. Smith - Colombia
 Greigia raporum H. Luther - Peru
 Greigia rohwederi L.B. Smith, O. Rohweder - El Salvador, Honduras
 Greigia sanctae-martae L.B. Smith - Colombia 
 Greigia sodiroana Mez - Ecuador
 Greigia sphacelata (Ruiz & Pavón) Regel - Chile
 Greigia stenolepis L.B. Smith - Colombia, Ecuador, Bolivia
 Greigia steyermarkii L.B. Smith - Guatemala, Honduras
 Greigia sylvicola Standley - Costa Rica, Panama
 Greigia tillettii L.B. Smith & R.W. Read - Venezuela 
 Greigia van-hyningii L.B. Smith - Veracruz, Oaxaca, Chiapas
 Greigia vilcabambae H. Luther - Peru
 Greigia vulcanica André - Colombia, Ecuador

References

External links
 BSI Genera Gallery photos
 http://fcbs.org/pictures/Greigia.htm

 
Bromeliaceae genera